Sir William Chandler Roberts-Austen  (3 March 1843, Kennington – 22 November 1902, London) was an English metallurgist noted for his research on the physical properties of metals and their alloys. The austenite class of iron alloys is named after him.

He was born William Chandler Roberts in Kennington, Surrey, the son of George and Maria née Chandler Roberts. He later (1885) assumed the name of Roberts-Austen at the request of his uncle, Major Nathaniel Lawrence Austen, as a condition of inheritance. He was educated privately and at the Royal School of Mines (1861–1865).

He was appointed Assistant to the Master of the Mint and then Chemist of the Royal Mint (1869), Professor of Metallurgy at the School of Mines (1880) and Chemist and Assayer to the Royal Mint (1882–1902). He developed procedures for the analysis of alloy constituents and an automatic recording pyrometer used to record temperature changes in furnaces and molten materials;. He became a world authority on the technical aspects of minting coins. His work had many practical and industrial applications.

He was elected a Fellow of the Royal Society in June 1875 and was their Bakerian Lecturer in 1896. He was made CB in 1890 and knighted (KCB) in 1899. He was also a Chevalier of the Legion d'honneur.

He was largely responsible for the building of St Martin's chapel of ease, Blackheath, Surrey, in 1893. He died at his residence in the Royal Mint and was buried in St Martin's churchyard, Canterbury, Kent.

He had married Florence Maude Alldridge in London in 1876.

References

External links 

 Encyclopædia Britannica Article
 Vauxhall Society Article - link broken August 2009
 Biographical sketch on CAT.INIST (some French)
 Imperial College London Stub Bio

1843 births
1902 deaths
People from Kennington
Knights Commander of the Order of the Bath
British metallurgists
Fellows of the Royal Society
Chevaliers of the Légion d'honneur